Wilcox is an unincorporated community in western Nodaway County, in the U.S. state of Missouri.

The community is located on US Route 71 approximately six miles northwest of Maryville and six miles southeast of Burlington Junction.

History
Wilcox was laid out in 1879, and named after B. S. Wilcox, a first settler. A post office called Wilcox was established in 1880, and remained in operation until 1954.

References

Unincorporated communities in Nodaway County, Missouri
Unincorporated communities in Missouri